James Masango is a South African politician, and a member of the opposition Democratic Alliance (DA). He currently serves in the national leadership as deputy chairperson of the Federal Council, and as a municipal councillor for the DA in Govan Mbeki municipality. Masango is the former leader of the opposition in the Mpumalanga provincial legislature, and was also formerly a member of Parliament's National Assembly (MP), where he served as the Chairperson of Caucus.

He first became a DA MP in 2004.

Political career 

Masango joined the small Democratic Party in 1994. He was a ward councillor in the Govan Mbeki Municipality before being elected to Parliament for the renamed DA in 2004. Masango served on the Sport and Recreation and Housing portfolio committees, and was the Shadow Deputy Minister of Defense and Military Veterans. Masango was re-elected to Parliament in 2009 and was appointed as the Shadow Minister of Public Works. He was succeeded by Anchen Dreyer in 2012. He also served as Chairperson of the DA caucus. After a stint in the Mpumalanga Provincial Legislature, he went back to the National Assembly in 2014, and served as the Deputy Shadow Minister of Public Works between 2014 and 2015.

Within the DA in Mpumalanga, he was elected deputy provincial chairperson in 2000 and then rose to become provincial chairperson in 2004, a position he held for 11 years. Following the resignation of the previous provincial leader Anthony Benadie in 2015, Masango stood for the post and was elected uncontested as Provincial Leader of the DA in Mpumalanga.

Following his election as provincial leader, Masango opted to be returned to the Mpumalanga Provincial Legislature, where he replaced Benadie as DA caucus leader and leader of the official opposition in the Legislature,

He held the position as provincial leader for 3 years, before standing aside in favor of Jane Sithole in 2018, but continued as DA leader in the Legislature until the 2019 election. Masango then initially retired from politics, but soon returned to active party work in late 2020 and stood uncontested for one of the two deputy chairpersons of the Federal Council at the party's elective congress in October. He assumed the post on 1 November 2020.

In 2021, Masango was sworn in as a PR councillor, once again representing the DA in Govan Mbeki Local Municipality.

References 

Living people
Democratic Alliance (South Africa) politicians
Members of the National Council of Provinces
Year of birth missing (living people)
Members of the Mpumalanga Provincial Legislature